The Georgia Sports Hall of Fame is located in Macon, Georgia.

Exhibitions
Interactive exhibits in the museum include NASCAR simulators, basketball and football games, and computer programs.

Governance
The Hall of Fame is owned by the state of Georgia and operated by the Georgia Sports Hall of Fame Authority. It is governed by an 18-member Authority appointed by the Governor, Lt. Governor, and Speaker of the House of Representatives of the State of Georgia.

History
The Hall of Fame portion of the museum was created in 1956 as the Georgia Prep Sports Hall of Fame. In 1963 it was expanded to encompass prep, college, amateur and professional sports. In 1978 the Georgia Sports Hall of Fame was officially created by the Georgia State Legislature. Then, in 1994 the state of Georgia appropriated $6.5 million to construct the Sports Hall of fame museum, and added another $1.8 million in 1996. The total construction of the building and its exhibits cost $8.3 million. The building opened in 1999 and had more than 65,000 visitors during its first year of operations. Yearly operations are partially funded by the State of Georgia and partnerships with local organizations provide in-kind contributions and relationships. Additional fundraising is continued through facility rentals, a 5k walk, and Hall of Fame induction-ceremony table sales.

Meetings
Meetings for the inductions process for the Georgia State Hall of Fame are now all open to the public. While inductee selection was always public, screening meetings only recently became open and it is considered somewhat controversial. To date, over 300 members have been inducted into the Hall of Fame.

Rentals
The Georgia Sports Hall of Fame has developed extensive rental programs aimed at youth, and area organizations. Youth party possibilities (price varies on number of attendees) include admission to the museum, catering availability, access to chairs and tables, and use of the Georgia room for two hours. Equipment rentals are available for parties including: TV/VCR, overhead projectors, portable screens and easels. In addition to youth parties, the Hall of Fame also offers rentals of the Conference Room (capacity 15), the Georgia Room (in classroom, banquet, reception or theater style), the Rotunda (Banquet or Reception style) and the Theater (205 capacity)

The Building
The building itself was built to resemble a turn-of-the-century ballpark, with red-brick exterior and green roof. From the old style ticket booths to the brick columns in the rotunda and special lighting the Hall of Fame was created to put visitors into the heart of a sports experience. Over 1,000 artifacts are on display in the building and over 7,000 objects in the Hall of Fame collection. In addition to the exhibits, the building also houses a  "Georgia Room" for rentals and receptions, a gift shop, a 205-seat theater, a research center, staff offices and storage space.

Inductees

See also
Ivan Allen Jr. Braves Museum and Hall of Fame
Ty Cobb Museum

External links

Georgia Lacrosse Chapter Hall of Fame (US Lacrosse). National Lacrosse Hall of Fame webpage. US Lacrosse website.

Halls of fame in Georgia (U.S. state)
State sports halls of fame in the United States
Sports museums in Georgia (U.S. state)
All-sports halls of fame
Museums in Macon, Georgia
International Sports Heritage Association
Cultural infrastructure completed in 1999
Awards established in 1959
1999 establishments in Georgia (U.S. state)